Wide Awake (also known as Return) is a 2007 South Korean film.

Plot 
In 1980s South Korea, a young boy is traumatised after experiencing anesthesia awareness during heart surgery, and no-one believes his story afterwards. Twenty-five years later, the doctors and nurses who operated on him begin to die under mysterious circumstances. Dr. Ryu Jae-woo, a surgeon married to Hee-jin, believes that the boy he remembers from his childhood is responsible for the deaths. The leading suspects are Lee Myeong-suk, who has been stalking Dr. Ryu, and the seemingly unhinged Uk-hwan. Hypnosis specialist Oh Chi-hoon also seems to know something about these deaths.

Cast 
 Kim Myung-min as Ryu Jae-woo
 Yoo Jun-sang as Kang Wook-han
 Kim Tae-woo as Oh Chi-hoon
 Jung Yoo-suk
 Kim Yoo-mi as Seo Hee-jin
 Kim Roi-ha as Lee Myeong-suk
 Baek Seung-hwan as Na Sang-woo
 Seo Young-hwa
 Lee Sung-min as Sang-woo's father

Release 
Wide Awake was released in South Korea on 8 August 2007, and its opening weekend was ranked fourth at the box office with 238,819 admissions. The film went on to receive a total of 677,939 admissions nationwide, with a gross (as of 16 September 2007) of US$4,569,126.

Awards and nominations 
2008 Grand Bell Awards
 Best Supporting Actor – Yoo Jun-sang
 Nomination – Best Music – Choi Seung-hyun

References

External links 
 
 
 

2007 films
2000s Korean-language films
South Korean serial killer films
South Korean thriller films
2000s South Korean films